The Von Trotha–Firestien Farm is a historic farm near Bracewell in Weld County, Colorado, United States.  The farm was established circa 1887 by the von Trotha family and expanded with the work of a family of Russian German immigrants, the Fiersteins, in the 1910s.  Today, the farm is recognized as significant in the history of local agriculture, including the use of irrigation and advanced techniques of feeding livestock. It was added to the National Register of Historic Places on May 12, 2009.

See also
National Register of Historic Places listings in Weld County, Colorado

External links
 Von Trotha – Firestien Farm official website

References

1887 establishments in Colorado
Buildings and structures in Weld County, Colorado
Farms on the National Register of Historic Places in Colorado
German-Russian culture in Colorado
Historic districts on the National Register of Historic Places in Colorado
National Register of Historic Places in Weld County, Colorado